Dursey Island ( or ) lies at the southwestern tip of the Beara Peninsula in the west of County Cork in Ireland. Dursey Island is 6.5 kilometres long and 1.5 kilometres wide.  The island is separated from the mainland by a narrow stretch of water, Dursey Sound, which has a very strong tidal race, with the submerged Flag Rock close to the centre of the channel.

The island has just six or so permanent residents, and is connected to the mainland by Ireland's only cable car. The cable car system is due to be closed for maintenance from April until November 2022, during which period a temporary ferry is due to operate.

Dursey has no shops, pubs or restaurants. At one point there was a post office on the island; this has since closed.

Geography and fauna
The townlands on the island are Ballynacallagh, Kilmichael, and Tilickafinna. There are three main peaks, the highest 252m. The promontories and rocks off Dursey include:

Bull Rock
Off the western point of the island are three rocks: Bull Rock, Cow Rock and Calf Rock. Bull Rock Lighthouse, which stands on Bull Rock, was built in 1888 and automated in March 1991. Bull Rock was inhabited until this time.

Calf Rock
A staffed lighthouse on Calf Rock was destroyed in a storm in 1881 and its remains can still be seen.

Cow Rock
Cow Rock is home to a number of nesting colonies of seabirds. Dolphins, whales and basking shark are sometimes seen in the sea off the island.

History

Prehistoric sites have been surveyed on the island, including examples of bullaun and cup-marked stones in Ballynacallagh, a prehistoric hut site at Killowen, and a radial stone enclosure at Maughanaclea.

More prominent archaeological sites are visible at Ballynacallagh, where there is a ruined monastic church and graveyard, and at the site of a castle on Oileán Beag ("Small Island"). In 1602 this castle site was a garrison of the O'Sullivan Beare family. It was destroyed (along with Dunboy Castle) during the Nine Years' War. Philip O'Sullivan Beare claimed that all of the occupants of the castle were killed by a force under the command of George Carew in the Dursey massacre. The 300 islanders were killed; Donal Cam O'Sullivan Beare gathered his people from across Cork and set off to take shelter with the O'Rourkes of Leitrim. Of the 1,000 that set off, 35 survived to reach the O'Rourkes after the convoy was repeatedly attacked. Little evidence of the castle site remains.

On the highest point on the island, at Tilickafinna, is a signal tower dating to the Napoleonic Wars. This narrow rectangular tower had two storeys over a basement, with each storey supported by vaulted stonework. The tower has been in ruin since the mid-19th century.

During World War II a whitewashed sign saying Éire was built and painted close to the signal tower to indicate to pilots that they were overflying neutral Ireland. In July 1943 a Luftwaffe Junkers Ju 88 crashed in fog on Crow Head near Dursey, killing all crew.

Tourism

The island is popular with day-trippers and walkers during the summer months. A waymarked section of the Beara Way loops around the island. Dursey Island's Beara Way walk marks the beginning of Europe's E8 European long distance path, which crosses Europe, ending in Istanbul, Turkey.

Spanning Dursey Sound, the aerial tramway is Ireland's only cable car, and one of the few cable cars that cross the sea in Europe. Used both by tourists and the local population, it has been closed for maintenance for much of 2022.

Dursey Sound is also one of the "signature discovery points" along the Wild Atlantic Way - a coastal touring route that stretches along Ireland's Atlantic coastline.

Dursey has no shops, pubs or restaurants, but a few holiday homes are rented on the island.

Gallery

References

Islands of County Cork
Tourist attractions in County Cork
Beara peninsula